Michael Kwan Ching-kit is a Hong Kong Cantopop singer previously with the Philips label (the brand Polygram was not adopted until later in Hong Kong), and later with EMI. His back catalogue (1986–1988) continues to be published by Universal Music Group. He retired his music career in 1988 and now works as an architect in Seattle, United States, with his wife and son.

Biography
Kwan was born in 1949 in Hong Kong, he attended St. Paul's Co-educational College and graduated in 1969. He was admitted in the University of Hong Kong in the same year and later graduated with a degree of Bachelor of Architecture. Kwan practiced architecture full-time after graduation and founded his practice in 1983.  His wife is also an architect.

Due to his amateur status as a singer, he was never eligible to be awarded lifetime achievement awards despite having sung 78 theme songs for Hong Kong television dramas, like Reincarnated (1978).  Before the 1970s, he was an English folk song singer for The Swinging Minstrels.  He also declined to accept the Golden Needle Award in 1993 due to him being out of the spotlight for so long.  The award was not awarded at all that year.  He did receive an equivalent of Meritorious Service Medal from the Queen in 1985 for services to Cantopop.

References 

1949 births
Living people
Alumni of the University of Hong Kong
Hong Kong male singers
Hong Kong architects
Place of birth missing (living people)
Alumni of St. Paul's Co-educational College
Architects from Seattle